The 2012–13 Oklahoma City Thunder season was the 5th season of the franchise in Oklahoma City and the 47th in the National Basketball Association (NBA). After their trip to the NBA Finals, despite losing the Finals to the Miami Heat in five games, the Thunder improved on last season's output, winning 60 games, earning them the top seed in the Western Conference and second overall. The first round pitted the Thunder against the eight-seeded Houston Rockets, led by James Harden, a former Thunder player. Despite a season-ending injury to Russell Westbrook in Game 2, the Thunder still managed to breeze past the Rockets in six games, to advance to the next round, where they faced the Memphis Grizzlies. The absence of Westbrook, however, affected the Thunder and they would end up losing to the Grizzlies in five games.

Previous season
The Thunder finished the 2011–12 season 47–19 in the lockout shortened season to finish in first place in the Northwest Division, second in the Western Conference and qualified for the playoffs. The Thunder made it to the 2012 NBA Finals but were defeated 4-1 against the Miami Heat. Last season featured Kevin Durant's third consecutive scoring title, Durant being named the MVP of the 2012 NBA All-Star Game, All-Star appearances for Durant and Russell Westbrook, James Harden being awarded the NBA Sixth Man of the Year Award and an All-Defensive First-Team selection for Serge Ibaka.

Offseason

Draft picks

The Thunder had only their own first-round pick entering the draft. The Thunder traded their 2012 second-round pick in the Robert Vaden trade to the Minnesota Timberwolves back in 2011. The Thunder ended 2012 NBA Draft night with Baylor forward Perry Jones.

Trades

On October 27, the Thunder traded reigning sixth man of the year James Harden, Cole Aldrich, Daequan Cook and Lazar Hayward to the Houston Rockets in exchange for Kevin Martin, Jeremy Lamb, a 2013 first-round pick, a 2013 second-round pick and a 2014 first-round pick. Harden was set to hit restricted free agency following the 2012-13 season and was unable to work out an extension. The Thunder offered a four-year, $55 million extension which was $4.5 million less than the max contract that Harden coveted. Due to the NBA's luxury tax, the Thunder were unwilling to offer a max extension to Harden in order to avoid paying hefty taxes. 
Two years later, Harden reiterated the point that he would still be with the Thunder had money not been an issue.

In exchange for Harden, the Thunder received Kevin Martin and Jeremy Lamb. Martin came off the 2011-12 season as the leading scorer for the Rockets, averaging 17.1 points. Martin, who since been a starter since 2006, became the Thunder's new sixth man. Lamb, a rookie out of UConn was also sent to the Thunder. Lamb was originally selected 12th overall in the 2012 NBA Draft coming off two seasons with the Huskies with career averages of 14.1 points.

Free agency

For this offseason, free agency began on July 1st, 2012 while the July moratorium ended on July 11. Derek Fisher, Royal Ivey and Nazr Mohammed were set to hit unrestricted free agency. On July 27, Royal Ivey and Nazr Mohammed signed with the Philadelphia 76ers and the Chicago Bulls respectively. On November 28, Derek Fisher signed a one-year deal with the Dallas Mavericks.

On July 11, Hasheem Thabeet signed a contract with the Thunder. Thabeet was originally selected 2nd overall in the 2009 NBA Draft that saw James Harden go 3rd overall. Thabeet spent the 2011-12 season with the Houston Rockets and Portland Trail Blazers. On September 12, DeAndre Liggins signed a contract with the Thunder. Liggins was originally selected 53rd overall in the 2011 NBA Draft spending only one season with the Orlando Magic last year. On October 31, Daniel Orton signed a contract with the Thunder. Orton, who also spent last season with the Orlando Magic, was originally selected 29th overall in the 2010 NBA Draft.

On August 18, Serge Ibaka agreed to a four-year, $48 million contract extension to stay with the Thunder.

Front office and coaching changes
On October 12, the Thunder announced Mike Wilks as a pro scout. Wilks joins the Thunder after playing seven seasons in the league, including a stint with the Thunder during the 2008-09 season.

Roster

Standings

Conference

Division

Game log

Preseason

|- style="background:#fcc;"
| 1
| October 7
| @ Houston
| 
| Russell Westbrook (19)
| Cole Aldrich (11)
| Reggie Jackson (5)
| Toyota Center5,198
| 0–1
|- style="background:#fcc;"
| 2
| October 12
| @ Utah
| 
| Perry Jones III (14)
| Cole Aldrich (10)
| Eric Maynor (5)
| EnergySolutions Arena17,786
| 0–2
|- style="background:#cfc;"
| 3
| October 16
| Charlotte
| 
| Andy Rautins (20)
| Serge Ibaka (10)
| Kevin Durant, Eric Maynor (7)
| Chesapeake Energy Arena18,203
| 1–2
|- style="background:#cfc;"
| 4
| October 19
| Phoenix
| 
| Kevin Durant (22)
| Serge Ibaka (8)
| Russell Westbrook (12)
| BOK Center18,233
| 2–2
|- style="background:#cfc;"
| 5
| October 21
| Denver
| 
| Three players (16)
| Cole Aldrich (7)
| Russell Westbrook (9)
| Chesapeake Energy Arena18,203
| 3–2
|- style="background:#fcc;"
| 6
| October 23
| @ Chicago
| 
| Serge Ibaka (24)
| Hasheem Thabeet (10)
| James Harden (7)
| United Center21,532
| 3–3
|- style="background:#cfc;"
| 7
| October 24
| Dallas
| 
| Kevin Durant (18)
| Kevin Durant, Serge Ibaka (7)
| Russell Westbrook (6)
| Intrust Bank Arena15,004
| 4–3

Regular season

|- style="background:#fcc;"
| 1 || November 1 || @ San Antonio
| 
| Kevin Durant (23)
| Kevin Durant (14)
| Durant, Westbrook & Martin (5)
| AT&T Center18,581
| 0–1
|- style="background:#cfc;"       
| 2 || November 2 || Portland
| 
| Russell Westbrook (32)
| Kevin Durant (17)
| Kevin Durant (7)
| Chesapeake Energy Arena18,203
| 1–1
|- style="background:#fcc;"       
| 3 || November 4 || Atlanta
| 
| Kevin Martin (28)
| Kevin Durant (12)
| Russell Westbrook (9)
| Chesapeake Energy Arena18,203
| 1–2
|- style="background:#cfc;"       
| 4 || November 6 || Toronto
| 
| Russell Westbrook (19)
| Kendrick Perkins (9)
| Russell Westbrook (8)
| Chesapeake Energy Arena18,203
| 2–2
|- style="background:#cfc;"       
| 5 || November 8 || @ Chicago
| 
| Kevin Durant (24)
| Serge Ibaka (9)
| Russell Westbrook (12)
| United Center21,737
| 3–2
|- style="background:#cfc;"       
| 6 || November 9 || Detroit
| 
| Durant & Ibaka (24)
| Kevin Durant (13)
| Westbrook & Perkins (6)
| Chesapeake Energy Arena18,203
| 4-2
|- style="background:#cfc;"       
| 7 || November 11 || Cleveland
| 
| Russell Westbrook (27)
| Kevin Durant (8)
| Russell Westbrook (10)
| Chesapeake Energy Arena18,203
| 5-2
|- style="background:#cfc;"       
| 8 || November 12 || @ Detroit
| 
| Russell Westbrook (33)
| Russell Westbrook (10)
| Russell Westbrook (4)
| The Palace of Auburn Hills12,784
| 6-2
|- style="background:#fcc;"       
| 9 || November 14 || Memphis
| 
| Kevin Durant (34)
| Kevin Durant (10)
| Russell Westbrook (13)
| Chesapeake Energy Arena18,203
| 6-3
|- style="background:#cfc;"       
| 10 || November 16 || @ New Orleans
| 
| Durant & Martin (27)
| Durant & Thabeet (9)
| Russell Westbrook (12)
| New Orleans Arena15,458
| 7-3
|- style="background:#cfc;"       
| 11 || November 18 || Golden State
| 
| Russell Westbrook (30)
| Kevin Durant (13)
| Kevin Durant (10)
| Chesapeake Energy Arena18,203
| 8-3
|- style="background:#cfc;"       
| 12 || November 21 || L. A. Clippers
| 
| Kevin Durant (35)
| Serge Ibaka (12)
| Russell Westbrook (9)
| Chesapeake Energy Arena18,203
| 9-3
|- style="background:#fcc;"       
| 13 || November 23 || @ Boston
| 
| Kevin Durant (29)
| Serge Ibaka (13)
| Russell Westbrook (8)
| TD Garden18,624
| 9-4
|- style="background:#cfc;"       
| 14 || November 24 || @ Philadelphia
| 
| Kevin Durant (37)
| Serge Ibaka (9)
| Russell Westbrook (9)
| Wells Fargo Center19,611
| 10-4
|- style="background:#cfc;"       
| 15 || November 26 || Charlotte
| 
| Kevin Durant (18)
| Hasheem Thabeet (10)
| Russell Westbrook (11)
| Chesapeake Energy Arena18,203
| 11-4
|- style="background:#cfc;"      
| 16 || November 28 || Houston
| 
| Kevin Durant (37)
| Serge Ibaka (9)
| Russell Westbrook (9)
| Chesapeake Energy Arena18,203
| 12-4
|- style="background:#cfc;"       
| 17 || November 30 || Utah
| 
| Kevin Durant (25)
| Russell Westbrook (13)
| Russell Westbrook (8)
| Chesapeake Energy Arena18,203
| 13-4

|- style="background:#cfc;"     
| 18 || December 1 || @ New Orleans
| 
| Kevin Durant (20)
| Kevin Durant (8)
| Russell Westbrook (10)
| New Orleans Arena14,547
| 14-4
|- style="background:#cfc;"     
| 19 || December 4 || @ Brooklyn
| 
| Kevin Durant (32)
| Kendrick Perkins (7)
| Russell Westbrook (9)
| Barclays Center17,732
| 15-4
|- style="background:#cfc;"      
| 20 || December 7 || L. A. Lakers
| 
| Kevin Durant (36)
| Kevin Durant (9)
| Russell Westbrook (8)
| Chesapeake Energy Arena18,203
| 16-4
|- style="background:#cfc;"     
| 21 || December 9 || Indiana
| 
| Kevin Durant (27)
| Ibaka & Perkins (9)
| Russell Westbrook (6)
| Chesapeake Energy Arena18,203
| 17-4
|- style="background:#cfc;"
| 22 || December 12 || New Orleans
| 
| Kevin Durant (35)
| Kevin Durant (9)
| Russell Westbrook (9)
| Chesapeake Energy Arena18,203
| 18-4
|- style="background:#cfc;"
| 23 || December 14 || Sacramento
| 
| Kevin Durant (31)
| Serge Ibaka (11)
| Russell Westbrook (13)
| Chesapeake Energy Arena18,203
| 19-4
|- style="background:#cfc;"      
| 24 || December 17 || San Antonio
| 
| Serge Ibaka (25)
| Serge Ibaka (17)
| Russell Westbrook (9)
| Chesapeake Energy Arena18,203
| 20-4
|- style="background:#cfc;"      
| 25 || December 19 || @ Atlanta
| 
| Kevin Durant (41)
| Serge Ibaka (14)
| Russell Westbrook (11)
| Philips Arena16,284
| 21-4
|- style="background:#fcc;"      
| 26 || December 20 || @ Minnesota
| 
| Kevin Durant (33)
| Russell Westbrook (11)
| Russell Westbrook (9)
| Target Center17,114
| 21-5
|- style="background:#fcc;"      
| 27 || December 25 || @ Miami
| 
| Kevin Durant (33)
| Russell Westbrook (11)
| Durant & Westbrook (3)
| American Airlines Arena20,300
| 21-6
|- style="background:#cfc;"      
| 28 || December 27 || Dallas
| 
| Kevin Durant (40)
| Serge Ibaka (17)
| Russell Westbrook (10)
| Chesapeake Energy Arena18,203
| 22-6
|- style="background:#cfc;"      
| 29 || December 29 || @ Houston
| 
| Russell Westbrook (28)
| Ibaka & Collison (10)
| Russell Westbrook (8)
| Toyota Center18,460
| 23-6
|- style="background:#cfc;"      
| 30 || December 31 || Phoenix
| 
| Kevin Durant (30)
| Nick Collison (9)
| Russell Westbrook (9)
| Chesapeake Energy Arena18,203
| 24-6

|- style="background:#fcc;"      
| 31 || January 2 || Brooklyn
| 
| Kevin Durant (27)
| Kendrick Perkins (11)
| Russell Westbrook (10)
| Chesapeake Energy Arena18,203
| 24-7
|- style="background:#cfc;"      
| 32 || January 4 || Philadelphia
| 
| Russell Westbrook (27)
| Serge Ibaka (10)
| Russell Westbrook (5)
| Chesapeake Energy Arena18,203
| 25-7
|- style="background:#cfc;"      
| 33 || January 6 || @ Toronto
| 
| Russell Westbrook (23)
| Ibaka & Collison (8)
| Durant & Westbrook (7)
| Air Canada Centre17,634
| 26-7
|- style="background:#fcc;"      
| 34 || January 7 || @ Washington
| 
| Kevin Durant (29)
| Ibaka & Perkins (11)
| Durant & Westbrook (8)
| Verizon Center16,917
| 26-8
|- style="background:#cfc;"      
| 35 || January 9 || Minnesota
| 
| Kevin Durant (26)
| Durant & Westbrook (8)
| Russell Westbrook (8)
| Chesapeake Energy Arena18,203
| 27-8
|- style="background:#cfc;"
| 36 || January 11 || @ L. A. Lakers
| 
| Kevin Durant (42)
| Perkins & Collison (9)
| Russell Westbrook (10)
| Staples Center 18,997
| 28-8
|- style="background:#cfc;"      
| 37 || January 13 || @ Portland
| 
| Kevin Durant (33)
| Kendrick Perkins (12)
| Russell Westbrook (9)
| Rose Garden20,423
| 29-8
|- style="background:#cfc;"      
| 38 || January 14 || @ Phoenix
| 
| Kevin Durant (41)
| Kendrick Perkins (13)
| Russell Westbrook (5)
| US Airways Center14,951
| 30-8
|- style="background:#cfc;"      
| 39 || January 16 || Denver
| 
| Russell Westbrook (32)
| Ibaka & Jackson (6)
| Reggie Jackson (7)
| Chesapeake Energy Arena18,203
| 31-8
|- style="background:#cfc;"      
| 40 || January 18 || @ Dallas
| 
| Kevin Durant (52)
| Serge Ibaka (14)
| Russell Westbrook (6)
| American Airlines Center20,434
| 32-8
|- style="background:#fcc;"      
| 41 || January 20 || @ Denver
| 
| Kevin Durant (37)
| Russell Westbrook (8)
| Russell Westbrook (9)
| Pepsi Center19,155
| 32-9
|- style="background:#cfc;"      
| 42 || January 22 || @ L. A. Clippers
| 
| Kevin Durant (32)
| Serge Ibaka (9)
| Kevin Durant (7)
| Staples Center19,451
| 33-9
|- style="background:#fcc;"      
| 43 || January 23 || @ Golden State
| 
| Kevin Durant (33)
| Kendrick Perkins (6)
| Kevin Durant (9)
| Oracle Arena19,596
| 33-10
|- style="background:#cfc;"      
| 44 || January 25 || @ Sacramento
| 
| Durant & Martin (24)
| Kevin Durant (11)
| Russell Westbrook (14)
| Sleep Train Arena15,022
| 34-10
|- style="background:#fcc;"      
| 45 || January 27 || @ L. A. Lakers
| 
| Kevin Durant (35)
| Russell Westbrook (9)
| Russell Westbrook (13)
| Staples Center18,997
| 34-11
|- style="background:#cfc;"
| 46 || January 31 || Memphis
| 
| Kevin Durant (27)
| Russell Westbrook (9)
| Durant & Westbrook (6)
| Chesapeake Energy Arena18,203
| 35-11

|- style="background:#fcc;"
| 47 || February 2 || @ Cleveland
| 
| Kevin Durant (32)
| Serge Ibaka (12)
| Westbrook & Perkins (5)
| Quicken Loans Arena20,562
| 35-12
|- style="background:#cfc;"      
| 48 || February 4 || Dallas
| 
| Russell Westbrook (24)
| Kevin Durant (10)
| Russell Westbrook (7)
| Chesapeake Energy Arena18,203
| 36-12
|- style="background:#cfc;"      
| 49 || February 6 || Golden State
| 
| Kevin Durant (25)
| Kendrick Perkins (11)
| Reggie Jackson (6)
| Chesapeake Energy Arena18,203
| 37-12
|- style="background:#cfc;"      
| 50 || February 8 || Phoenix
| 
| Kevin Durant (21)
| Kendrick Perkins (9)
| Russell Westbrook (6)
| Chesapeake Energy Arena18,203
| 38-12
|- style="background:#cfc;"     
| 51 || February 10 || @ Phoenix
| 
| Russell Westbrook (24)
| Durant & Jackson (7)
| Russell Westbrook (6)
| US Airways Center16,773
| 39-12
|- style="background:#fcc;"      
| 52 || February 12 || @ Utah
| 
| Kevin Durant (33)
| Kevin Durant (6)
| Durant & Westbrook (5)
| EnergySolutions Arena18,552
| 39-13
|- style="background:#fcc;"     
| 53 || February 14 || Miami
| 
| Kevin Durant (40)
| Kevin Durant (8)
| Russell Westbrook (10)
| Chesapeake Energy Arena18,203
| 39-14
|- align="center"
|colspan="9" bgcolor="#bbcaff"|All-Star Break
|- style="background:#fcc;"     
| 54 || February 20 || @ Houston
| 
| Westbrook & Sefolosha (28)
| Kevin Durant (12)
| Kevin Durant (11)
| Toyota Center18,224
| 39-15
|- style="background:#cfc;"      
| 55 || February 22 || Minnesota
| 
| Russell Westbrook (37)
| Durant, Ibaka, Perkins & Westbrook (7)
| Russell Westbrook (9)
| Chesapeake Energy Arena18,203
| 40-15
|- style="background:#cfc;"      
| 56 || February 24 || Chicago
| 
| Russell Westbrook (23)
| Kevin Durant (16)
| Kevin Durant (6)
| Chesapeake Energy Arena18,203
| 41-15
|- style="background:#cfc;"     
| 57 || February 27 || New Orleans
| 
| Russell Westbrook (29)
| Kevin Durant (11)
| Kevin Durant (10)
| Chesapeake Energy Arena18,203
| 42-15

|- style="background:#fcc;"     
| 58 || March 1 || @ Denver
| 
| Russell Westbrook (38)
| Kevin Durant (14)
| Thabo Sefolosha (5)
| Pepsi Center19,521
| 42-16
|- style="background:#cfc;"      
| 59 || March 3 || @ L. A. Clippers
| 
| Kevin Durant (35)
| Kevin Durant (9)
| Russell Westbrook (10)
| Staples Center19,371
| 43-16
|- style="background:#cfc;"     
| 60 || March 5 || L. A. Lakers
| 
| Russell Westbrook (37)
| Russell Westbrook (10)
| Durant, Martin, & Westbrook (5)
| Chesapeake Energy Arena18,203
| 44-16
|- style="background:#cfc;"      
| 61 || March 7 || @ New York
| 
| Kevin Durant (34)
| Serge Ibaka (9)
| Kevin Durant (6)
| Madison Square Garden19,033
| 45-16
|- style="background:#cfc;"      
| 62 || March 8 || @ Charlotte
| 
| Kevin Durant (19)
| Hasheem Thabeet (8)
| Kevin Durant (7)
| Time Warner Cable Arena18,870
| 46-16
|- style="background:#cfc;"      
| 63 || March 10 || Boston
| 
| Kevin Durant (23)
| Kevin Durant (11)
| Kendrick Perkins (5)
| Chesapeake Energy Arena18,203
| 47-16
|- style="background:#fcc;"     
| 64 || March 11 || @ San Antonio
| 
| Kevin Durant (26)
| Serge Ibaka (16)
| Russell Westbrook (6)
| AT&T Center18,581
| 47-17
|- style="background:#cfc;"      
| 65 || March 13 || Utah
| 
| Kevin Durant (23)
| Kevin Durant (10)
| Russell Westbrook (9)
| Chesapeake Energy Arena18,203
| 48-17
|- style="background:#cfc;"    
| 66 || March 15 || Orlando
| 
| Kevin Durant (26)
| Kendrick Perkins (12)
| Russell Westbrook (6)
| Chesapeake Energy Arena18,046
| 49-17
|- style="background:#cfc;"     
| 67 || March 17 || @ Dallas
| 
| Russell Westbrook (35)
| Serge Ibaka (16)
| Russell Westbrook (6)
| American Airlines Center20,284
| 50-17
|- style="background:#fcc;"     
| 68 || March 19 || Denver
| 
| Kevin Durant (34)
| Kendrick Perkins (11)
| Russell Westbrook (6)
| Chesapeake Energy Arena18,203
| 50-18
|- style="background:#fcc;"      
| 69 || March 20 || @ Memphis
| 
| Kevin Durant (32)
| Kendrick Perkins (16)
| Durant & Westbrook (4)
| FedExForum18,119
| 50-19
|- style="background:#cfc;"      
| 70 || March 22 || @ Orlando
| 
| Kevin Durant (25)
| Serge Ibaka (13)
| Russell Westbrook (9)
| Amway Center17,429
| 51-19
|- style="background:#cfc;"      
| 71 || March 24 || Portland
| 
| Kevin Durant (24)
| Kevin Durant (10)
| Russell Westbrook (9)
| Chesapeake Energy Arena18,203
| 52-19
|- style="background:#cfc;"      
| 72 || March 27 || Washington
| 
| Russell Westbrook (21)
| Kendrick Perkins (11)
| Kevin Durant (6)
| Chesapeake Energy Arena18,203
| 53-19
|- style="background:#fcc;"      
| 73 || March 29 || @ Minnesota
| 
| Kevin Durant (36)
| Serge Ibaka (11)
| Russell Westbrook (9)
| Target Center  18,121
| 53-20
|- style="background:#cfc;"     
| 74 || March 30 || @ Milwaukee
| 
| Kevin Durant (30)
| Russell Westbrook (13)
| Russell Westbrook (10)
| BMO Harris Bradley Center17,578
| 54-20

|- style="background:#cfc;"      
| 75 || April 4 || San Antonio
| 
| Russell Westbrook (27)
| Serge Ibaka (11)
| Russell Westbrook (7)
| Chesapeake Energy Arena18,203
| 55-20
|- style="background:#cfc;"       
| 76 || April 5 || @ Indiana
| 
| Kevin Durant (34)
| Kevin Durant (9)
| Russell Westbrook (9)
| Bankers Life Fieldhouse18,165
| 56-20
|- style="background:#fcc;"       
| 77 || April 7 || New York
| 
| Russell Westbrook (37)
| Russell Westbrook (11)
| Russell Westbrook (8)
| Chesapeake Energy Arena18,203
| 56-21
|- style="background:#cfc;"       
| 78 || April 9 || @ Utah
| 
| Russell Westbrook (25)
| Kevin Durant (12)
| Kevin Durant (9)
| EnergySolutions Arena19,610
| 57-21
|- style="background:#cfc;"      
| 79 || April 11 || @ Golden State
| 
| Kevin Durant (31)
| Kevin Durant (10)
| Russell Westbrook (9)
| Oracle Arena19,596
| 58-21
|- style="background:#cfc;"
| 80 || April 12 || @ Portland
| 
| Russell Westbrook (33)
| Ronnie Brewer (7)
| Kevin Durant (6)
| Rose Garden20,577
| 59-21
|- style="background:#cfc;"       
| 81 || April 15 || Sacramento
| 
| Kevin Durant (29)
| Ronnie Brewer (13)
| Durant & Westbrook (8)
| Chesapeake Energy Arena18,203
| 60-21
|- style="background:#fcc;"       
| 82 || April 17 || Milwaukee
| 
| Reggie Jackson (23)
| Perry Jones III (9)
| Reggie Jackson (5)
| Chesapeake Energy Arena18,203
| 60-22

Playoffs

|- style="background:#cfc;"
| 1
| April 21
| Houston
| 
| Kevin Durant (24)
| Russell Westbrook (8)
| Russell Westbrook (10)
| Chesapeake Energy Arena18,203
| 1-0
|- style="background:#cfc;"
| 2
| April 24
| Houston
| 
| Durant & Westbrook (29)
| Serge Ibaka (11)
| Kevin Durant (9)
| Chesapeake Energy Arena18,203
| 2-0
|- style="background:#cfc;"
| 3
| April 27
| @ Houston
| 
| Kevin Durant (41)
| Kevin Durant (11)
| Kevin Durant (4)
| Toyota Center18,163
| 3-0
|- style="background:#fcc;"
| 4
| April 29
| @ Houston
| 
| Kevin Durant (38)
| Kevin Durant (8)
| Kevin Durant (6)
| Toyota Center18,081
| 3-1
|- style="background:#fcc;"
| 5
| May 1
| Houston
| 
| Kevin Durant (36)
| Serge Ibaka (9)
| Kevin Durant (7)
| Chesapeake Energy Arena18,203
| 3-2
|- style="background:#cfc;"
| 6
| May 3
| @ Houston
| 
| Kevin Durant (27)
| Nick Collison (9)
| Reggie Jackson (8)
| Toyota Center18,357
| 4-2

|- style="background:#cfc;"
| 1
| May 5
| Memphis
| 
| Kevin Durant (35)
| Kevin Durant (15)
| Kevin Durant (6)
| Chesapeake Energy Arena18,203
| 1-0
|- style="background:#fcc;"
| 2
| May 7
| Memphis
| 
| Kevin Durant (36)
| Kevin Durant (11)
| Mike Conley (9)
| Chesapeake Energy Arena18,203
| 1-1
|- style="background:#fcc;"
| 3
| May 11
| @ Memphis
| 
| Kevin Durant (25)
| Kevin Durant (11)
| Mike Conley (6)
| FedExForum18,119
| 1-2
|- style="background:#fcc;"
| 4
| May 13
| @ Memphis
| 
| Kevin Durant (27)
| Serge Ibaka (14)
| Reggie Jackson (8)
| FedExForum18,119
| 1-3
|- style="background:#fcc;"
| 5
| May 15
| Memphis
| 
| Zach Randolph (28)
| Zach Randolph (14)
| Mike Conley (11)
| Chesapeake Energy Arena18,203
| 1-4

Player statistics

Regular season

 Led team in statistic
After all games.
‡ Waived during the season
† Traded during the season
≠ Acquired during the season

Playoffs

 Led team in statistic
After all games.

Individual game highs

Awards and records

Awards

Transactions

Overview

Trades

Free agency

Re-signed

Additions

Subtractions

References

Oklahoma City Thunder seasons
Oklahoma City Thunder
2012 in sports in Oklahoma
2013 in sports in Oklahoma